Manokwari is a coastal town and the capital of the Indonesian province of West Papua. It is one of only seven provincial capitals of Indonesia without a city status. It is also the administrative seat of Manokwari Regency. However, under proposals currently under consideration by the Indonesian Parliament, it is planned to split Manokwari town off from the regency and turn it into a separate city. The majority of Manokwari residents are Christians and the town is one of the seats of the Roman Catholic Diocese of Manokwari–Sorong.

History
Trade between the natives of the region and Southeast Asians probably began around the 15th century or even earlier. Possibly via Moluccan and Malay influence, some local chiefs of the town had adopted Islam by the 19th century. 

On 25 October 1793, Captain John Hayes in the merchant ships Duke of Clarence and Duchess raised the British flag at Dore Bay, which he called Restoration Bay as he had put in there to restore his crews' health) and claimed it and the surrounding area, which he called New Albion, for Great Britain. The British established a small settlement there to engage in the spice trade, especially in massoy bark and nutmeg. The British erected a small stockade fort, Fort Coronation, named in honour of King George III's coronation. For a variety of reasons the British East India Company, including changing priorities consequent on the outbreak of war with France, did not support the settlement. The settlement was not a success and in 1795 the British abandoned it.

In 1855, the first Christian mission was established in the town by German missionaries. However, it was not until the 20th century when majority of the locals converted to Christianity.

On 12 April 1942, a Japanese convoy steamed into Dore Bay and began landing approximately 4,000 men. The area was already well known to the Japanese, as the area was the location of a cotton plantation developed by the government-sponsored Nan’yō Kōhatsu development company from the early 1930s. At the beginning of 1942, the Royal Netherlands East Indies Army (KNIL) garrison at Manokwari consisted of approximately 125 KNIL troops, which included a number of civilians reservists and home guard who had been called up at the start of February 1942. As the KNIL ground force had no chance of successfully engaging the Japanese invasion force, it withdrew into the interior of Dutch New Guinea and initiated guerilla warfare.

At 4:43am on 4 January 2009 a magnitude 7.6 earthquake struck Manokwari. Felt as far away as Australia, the 35 km deep earthquake killed four people, injured 19 more and 167,000 people were left without power. Local residents were evacuated to Manokwari Military Academy in order to seek shelter from possible tsunamis and aftershocks that were felt throughout the day. Damage occurred to the Mutiara Hotel, the Naval hospital, and several other buildings. Manokwari Regional Airport had significant damage, being closest to the epicenter, and all four deaths resulted there. The Indonesian government sent a team of seven doctors to Manokwari to assist with the injured. Originally, the team was projected to be ten people, but due to the severe damage of the runway only seven were able to be transported in.  This was not unlike the previous quakes on 10 October 2002 when another 7.6 magnitude quake shook the region. In 1996 similar quakes also halted progress in the local region but there is no record of the recorded magnitude.

On 14 April 2010, Merpati Nusantara Airlines flight MZ 836, a Boeing 737-300 (registration PK-MDF) with 103 persons on board, broke into pieces as it bounced off the tarmac at Rendani Airport near Manokwari after landing in poor weather. The tail of the aircraft broke off and came to rest in the creek off the northern end of Runway 35. All passengers survived, but 21 injured people were admitted to hospital. The flight originated in Sorong, West Papua.

On 21 August 2019, Manokwari experienced a violent protest which saw the provincial legislature building torched, with the protest being part of the 2019 Papua protests.

Climate

Manokwari is three meters above sea level on the coast of West Papua. It is located 52 minutes (0.87 degrees, slightly less than 100 km) south of the equator and has an 86.3% average humidity. The annual sunshine hours are 2127; an average of 5.8 hours of sunlight per day. To date, there are no recorded days of frost or snowfall in Manokwari.

Demographic information
There are over twenty-four different tribal groups living in Manokwari. Each tribe has its own unique language and culture. The most prominent of the tribal groups are the Asmat and the Dani tribes people. The traditional house of Papua is the Honai, a rounded house made of a wood and grass roof covering. Due to the variety of cultures in Manokwari, several different regional instruments have been popularized to include the Atowo, Tifa and the Fu. Manokwari is an urbanized region, but in several of the regencies you can still find traditional garb. A Koteka is a hollowed out gourd used by tribesmen to cover their genitals. These tribal people are well known for their wooden sculptures of virility and beauty. These sculptures are sold both locally and globally and are part of Manokwari's exports. Among the other tribes are Kuri, Simuri, Irarutu, Sebyar, Mascona, Mairasi, Kambouw, Onim, Sekar, Maibrat, Tohit, Imeko, Moi, Tipin, Maya, and Biak.

Education
The State University of Papua was established on 3 November 2000. This university was created to help with the local education of the people of Papua. Among their achievements is the Beccariana, an academic journal published by the university. This publication contains all the research done by the university in the field of herbalism. The university is strategically located on a hill facing the town, surrounded by a dense tropical rain forest. This allows the researchers instant access to the biological samples and case studies.

Sister cities 
Sister cities of Manokwari are:

Derived name 
The land flatworm Platydemus manokwari was named after the town (where it was found) by French zoologist de Beauchamp in 1962.

Tourism
One tourist site is the white, sandy Doreri Bay Beach which has calm, shallow water and is very safe for swimming.
Arfak range nature reserve in the south of Manokwari is a popular tourist destination for visitors who are interested in hiking, birding and wildlife watching. Tropical rainforest that covers most of the mountains is the natural habitat of various species of animals including cuscus possum, lesser birds of paradise, common paradise kingfisher, magnificent riflebird as well as king bird of paradise. Susnguakti forest located in the south of the city is a popular destination for nature lovers who like camping and seeing the bio-diversity of the montane forest. Charles Roring is a tourist guide who regularly organizes birds of paradise and wildlife watching tours to Susnguakti forest of Manokwari.

Transport

Roads 
Manokwari has a road to connect from the city center, port or airport.

Sea 
Manokwari Port on Banjarmasin Street operates 24 hours a day.

Air 
Manokwari has an airport called Rendani Airport, The distance between Rendani Airport to downtown Manokwari is about 5 km distance.

Notes

References 
 Griffin, Andrew (1990), "London, Bengal, the China Trade and the Unfrequented Extremities of Asia: the East India Company's Settlement in New Guinea, 1793–95". British Library Journal.
 

 
Populated coastal places in Indonesia
Populated places in West Papua
Port cities and towns in Indonesia
Provincial capitals in Indonesia
Regency seats of West Papua (province)